Avdiyes is an old and uncommon Russian Christian male first name. Its form Avdiisus was included into various, often handwritten, church calendars throughout the 17th–19th centuries, but was omitted from the official Synodal Menologium at the end of the 19th century.

It is possibly derived from the Latin word audio, meaning to listen, or from the Biblical Hebrew abdiyës̄, meaning a servant (slave) of Jesus.

The patronymics derived from "Avdiyes" are "" (Avdiyesovich; masculine) and "" (Avdiyesovna; feminine).

References

Notes

Sources
Н. А. Петровский (N. A. Petrovsky). "Словарь русских личных имён" (Dictionary of Russian First Names). ООО Издательство "АСТ". Москва, 2005. 
[1] А. В. Суперанская (A. V. Superanskaya). "Современный словарь личных имён: Сравнение. Происхождение. Написание" (Modern Dictionary of First Names: Comparison. Origins. Spelling). Айрис-пресс. Москва, 2005. 
[2] А. В. Суперанская (A. V. Superanskaya). "Словарь русских имён" (Dictionary of Russian Names). Издательство Эксмо. Москва, 2005.